Free in the Streets is the second studio album by American electroclash group A.R.E. Weapons, released on September 20, 2005 by Defend Music.

Track listing 
 These Tears –	4:12
 Doghouse –	3:12
 Push Em Back –	3:40
 Hardcase –	3:38
 Reggie –	3:30
 Weakest Ones –	3:40
 Who Rules The Wasteland? –	3:18
 Last Cigarette –	2:32
 Be Nice –	3:42
 F.K.F –	3:05
 Brand New Walking Blues –	3:39
 Into The Night –	2:51

Personnel 
A.R.E. Weapons –	Mixing, Primary Artist, Producer
Jason LaFarge –	Engineer, Mixing
Brain F. McPeck –	Composer, Vocals
Paul Sevigny –	Keyboards
Arthur Winer –	Mastering

References 

A.R.E. Weapons albums
2005 albums
Defend Music albums